Hirst Priory is an 18th-century country house and grounds in Belton on the Isle of Axholme, North Lincolnshire, United Kingdom. The current building was built upon the site of a 12th-century Augustinian priory (Hirst Priory).

Hirst Priory served as a family residence first for the Stovin family, and then the Lister family in the 19th century. In 1903, the property was purchased by D. Stubley for £18,000. In the early 1990s, a development group purchased Hirst Priory in order to develop a hotel and leisure complex, but these plans were abandoned. In 2014, Hirst Priory was converted to a wedding and events venue, with renovation work carried out to ensure the preservation of the Grade II listed building.

Architecture 
Hirst Priory is a red brick-built structure consisting of a part subterranean basement, ground floor, first floor, and second-floor loft space which previously served as servants' quarters.

The house was built in two stages, with the older of the two parts containing a partially subterranean brick-vaulted basement. The extension added in the 19th century also has a basement area of more standard box-shaped dimensions. It has a hand wheel water pump, an end room with barred windows, and a reinforced door reputed to have served as a temporary holding cell for the local magistrates.

All the rooms, including the loft and the later basement extension, have open hearths. The northwest first-floor corner room includes a bread oven in addition to the fireplace. Under the courtyard on the West side of the building is a large vaulted and vented brick storage area, most likely used for keeping fuel stores dry. The building is only accessible via stepped entrances to ensure the ground floor is well above any potential flood level.

History 
Hirst Priory was the site of Augustinian Priory cell dependant on Nostell, founded by Nigel d'Albini early 12th century as Hyrst Priory. It was not conventual, and was probably for 1 or 2 canons supervising estate of Nostell. It was dissolved . A rectangular moat and buildings are shown on an "ancient map" and OS 1in. 1st Ed. 1824. "The moat is still perfect on the NE and W, and enclosed about half an acre of ground, an old barbary tree marks the place where the chapel stood; and at a short distance is the holy pond, which seems to have been a well dug to some small spring, which was descended by a few steps, of these there are some remains".

The present building is Georgian-Victorian, part of the moat survives, possibly altered by later landscaping.

Hirst Augustinian cell 
Founded before 1135 and dissolved in 1539, the Hirst Augustinian cell was dependent on Nostell. The priory of St. Mary was built as a dependency of Nostell by Nigel D'Albini, apparently in the reign of Henry I (Dugdale's Monasticon). The canon in charge may have had 2 companions at first, to comply with the regulations; but from the 14th century there was probably only one canon with 1 - 2 servants, supervising the estate of Nostell.

North Lincolnshire Heritage Environment Record 
The little cell of Hyrst in Axholme was built on lands granted by Nigel d'Albini to the prior and convent of Saint Oswalds, Nostell. The property consisted only of the grove and marsh of Hyrst, with certain tithes of corn, malt, and fish from the neighbourhood. In 1534 it still belonged to St. Oswald's Priory, and was worth £7 11s. 8d. a year (in the pre-decimal £sd system); in the Ministers' Accounts the value is said to be £9 8s. There is a seal of the twelfth or early thirteenth century. The obverse is pointed oval representing the Virgin seated on a throne, with nimbus, in the right hand the Child, in the left hand a scepter fleur-de-lys. The reverse is a small oval signet or counter seal representing Athena Nikephoros, to the right from an oval Greek gem'. Two arms of a potential moat were shown as earthworks on the Ordnance Survey 25" first edition map of 1887. They were located to the north and east of Hirst Priory house, and had garden pathways within the ditches. 'Hirst' was shown on Armstrong's map of Lincolnshire, published in 1778. A house was depicted within a rectangular moat, with entrances to the south and west.

Listed building 
Briefly the listing designation describes the property as a small country house, built early-mid 18th century for Richard Taylor or Jonathan Stovin, with later 18th-century alterations for Cornelius Stovin; substantial alterations and additions of mid-19th century for George Lister, including new west wing, remodelling north and south fronts, new balcony to south. The house stands in a partly moated enclosure, on or near the site of an Augustinian cell of Nostell Priory, founded in the early 12th century and dissolved .

As a wedding and events venue 
In 2014, Hirst Priory was converted into a wedding and events venue, and a number of changes were made to the building. Alterations in 2014 were largely confined to the ground floor, with two main rooms being knocked through to create an approximately 220m function space, and alterations to a washing room, cupboard, and existing toilet to create suitable guest toilet facilities. A second wall was also knocked through and a floating floor was added to create level access to a new bar area. The use of a floating floor prevented any potential damage to the existing wood paneling, door frame, and windows. Care had to be taken to protect the intricate grade II listed coving around the ceilings during the building works.

Owners & occupants 
 Nigel d' Albini (Son was Roger de Mowbray); granted by William the Conqueror
 Canons of St. Oswald at Nostell Priory 1540
 John Earl of Warren; granted after the Dissolution of the Monasteries
 William Breton of London 
 Alexander Bannister of Epworth
 Sir Peter Ewer
 Thomas Brewer
 Settled it upon his daughter and her heirs male, upon her marriage with John Taylor of Newland in Yorkshire; passed through family.
 Richard Taylor
 Jonathan Stovin of Tetley
 1759 - Cornelius Stovin, died 1814 (b. 1738, d. 1814) - son
 1814 - Cornelius Hartshorn Stovin, (b. 1798, d. 1845) - son
 1845 - Anna Maria Stovin (b. 1772, d. 1847) – sister
 1847 - James Lister (b. 1777, d. 1866) – cousin
 1866 - George Spofforth Lister (b. 1811, d. 1903) - son
 1903 – D. Stubley (d. 1934)

Tenants 
 1847 – 1866, George Spofforth Lister
 1869(?) – 1886, Thomas Harsley Carnochan – a solicitor in Crowle.
 1903 – 1934, D. Stubley – an existing tenant at time of purchase.

References

Works cited 

  SLS2918.
  SLS523.
 
  SLS3042.
 
 
 

Grade II listed houses
Houses in Lincolnshire